The Dominica Award of Honour is a decoration of the Commonwealth of Dominica.  Created in 1967, it is the highest honour presented by the President of the Commonwealth of Dominica on behalf of the state.

Insignia
The badge of the Dominica Award of Honour is an oval-shaped golden coloured medallion.  The outer ring of the medallion bears the inscription in relief THE DOMINICA AWARD OF HONOUR.  The center of the medallion is depicts the Coat of arms of Dominica.  The area around the coat of arms and the outer ring is cut out.

The badge is suspended from a ring attached at the top, and hangs from a yellow ribbon with a center stripe of black bordered on its outside by white.

Grades : one, rank of member

Notable recipients
 CARICOM
 Fidel Castro
 Elizabeth II
 Nicholas Liverpool
 Crispin Sorhaindo
 Eliud Williams
 HRH Prince Charles of Bourbon Two Sicilies, Duke of Castro

References

Orders, decorations, and medals of Dominica
Awards established in 1967